Hellmut Heinz Krug (born 19 May 1956, in Gelsenkirchen) is a retired German football referee. Krug officiated at both the 1994 FIFA World Cup and UEFA Euro 1996. In 1998, he refereed the UEFA Champions League final between Real Madrid and Juventus, and he also officiated a 2000 UEFA Cup semi-final first leg between Galatasaray and Leeds United. Krug additionally refereed at two UEFA European Championship tournaments, in 1992 and 1996.

Krug currently works as a pundit for German TV broadcaster Das Erste.

References

External links
 Profile at worldfootball.net

1956 births
Living people
German football referees
UEFA Champions League referees
FIFA World Cup referees
Sportspeople from Gelsenkirchen
1994 FIFA World Cup referees
UEFA Euro 1996 referees
UEFA Europa League referees
20th-century German people